Eva Heller (8 April 1948 - 31 January 2008) was a German writer and social scientist. She was born in Esslingen am Neckar.

Career 
As a writer, she published in a wide range of genres, including novels, children's books and non-fiction works. Her work has been translated into English. Her novel With the Next Man Everything Will Be Different was translated by Krishna Winston and won the Schlegel-Tieck Prize.

References

German women writers
Burials at Frankfurt Main Cemetery
1948 births
2008 deaths
People from Esslingen am Neckar